Oenothera parviflora, the northern evening primrose, is a species of flowering plant in the family Onagraceae. It is native to northeastern North America, and invasive in Europe, Asia, South Africa and New Zealand.

References

parviflora
Plants described in 1759
Taxa named by Carl Linnaeus